Akseh-ye Olya (also Romanized as ‘Akseh-ye ‘Olyā; also known as Āchseh-ye Bālā) is a village in Abdoliyeh-ye Sharqi Rural District, in the Central District of Ramshir County, Khuzestan Province, Iran. At the 2006 census, its population was 61, in 12 families.

References 

Populated places in Ramshir County